Majid Heidari (born July 13, 1982) is an Iranian football player who plays in the defender position. He is currently a member of the Iran's Premier League football club, Saba Qom F.C.

Club career 
Heidari plays for Pas Hamedan from 2009 to 2011. He joined Fajr Sepasi in 2011 but the contract had been terminated by the club because of the problems between Heidari and the club's coach, Mahmoud Yavari. in winter 2012 he joined Saba Qom.

Club career statistics

References

Iranian footballers
Association football defenders
Pas players
Fajr Sepasi players
Saba players
1982 births
Living people
People from Ray, Iran